The Samsung Galaxy J series is a discontinued line (but continued in software update) entry-level Android mobile produced by the South Korean company Samsung Electronics, first introduced in 2015. This series is a part of Samsung Galaxy series, preceding the current Galaxy M Series and placed below the mid-range Galaxy A Series.

History 
Being mainly positioned low-end segments, all models in the series have the essential features of a standard entry-level smartphone, and differ in size and design. The letter J stands for "Joy" or "Junior". However, new features such as slow motion and video recording at any resolution above 1080p and any frame rates above 30 frames per second are left out entirely.

Other materials are used, with Samsung targeting Asian markets or the European entry-level market. The models are updated at least annually, minor updates or variants are displayed with name additions such as Pro, Prime, Max, etc.

Despite having a similar name, the original Galaxy J (SGH-N075/SC-02F), released in 2013, does not actually belong to the Galaxy J series as this phone was only available in few markets, and also positioned as a high-end smartphone based on the Samsung Galaxy S4.

In September 2018, there were rumors that Samsung will reorganize their smartphone lineup by discontinuing the Galaxy J series along with the online-exclusive Galaxy On in favor of extending the mid-range Galaxy A series to lower-end segment and introducing the Galaxy M series as the new online-exclusive series of smartphones to better compete against the increasingly popular Chinese manufacturers, such as Huawei, Oppo, Vivo, and Xiaomi in the budget smartphone market. Samsung later introduced M10 and M20 in January 2019, followed by Galaxy A10, A30, and A50 the following month, and eventually announced that the Galaxy J series has officially merged into the Galaxy A series during the 2019 Galaxy A series launch event in April 2019 held in Thailand.

Models

Galaxy J1

Galaxy J2

Galaxy J3

Galaxy J4

Galaxy J5

Galaxy J6

Galaxy J7

Galaxy J8

Successor
The Galaxy J series was discontinued on 2019 in favor of extending the mid-range Galaxy A series into the entry-level segment, as well as introducing the online-exclusive Galaxy M series. The 2019 lineup also introduced Samsung's new naming scheme, with two-digit numbers as opposed to single digit of previous generation models.

See also 
 Samsung Galaxy
 Samsung Galaxy Note series
 Samsung Galaxy S series
 Samsung Galaxy A series
 Samsung Galaxy M series
 Samsung Galaxy Tab series
 Samsung Gear

References 

Samsung mobile series
Samsung Galaxy